The  is a limited express train service between  and  via the Hakodate and Nemuro Main Lines in Hokkaido, Japan, operated by Hokkaido Railway Company (JR Hokkaido). As of November 2013, there are five trains per day running in both directions, with the fastest journey taking 2 hours 25 minutes (Super Tokachi 4).

Stops
Trains stop at the following stations:

 -  -  -  -  -  -  -  -  -  -

Rolling stock
Super Tokachi services are formed of 4-car (originally 5-car) KiHa 261 series and 5-car KiHa 283 series diesel multiple unit (DMU) trains.

Formations
All cars are no-smoking.

KiHa 261 series

KiHa 283 series (Past)

Past

History
The service continued until 30 September 1968. 

The name was revived from 1 September 1990 as the Limited express  using KiHa 183 series DMUs. From 27 July 1991, four Tokachi services were upgraded to become Super Tokachi using KiHa 183 series DMU sets including bilevel Green cars.

From 1 October 2007, new 5-car KiHa 261-1000 series tilting DMUs were introduced on Super Tokachi services, with KiHa 283 series tilting DMUs also used on some services.

From 1 October 2009, the remaining two Tokachi return services daily were upgraded to Super Tokachi using KiHa 261-1000 series DMUs. However, the service was returned to simply Tokachi from the start of the revised timetable on 14 March 2020.

Discontinuation of catering services
From 1 November 2014, the refreshment trolley service and Green car complimentary drink service were discontinued, with refreshments sold instead in car 1. The refreshment service was discontinued entirely from 1 January 2015.

References

External links

 JR Hokkaido Super Tokachi train information 

Named passenger trains of Japan
Railway services introduced in 1962